The 1972 United States presidential election in Missouri took place on November 7, 1972. All fifty states and the District of Columbia were part of the 1972 United States presidential election. Voters chose 12 electors to the Electoral College, who voted for president and vice president.

Missouri was won by the Republican nominees, incumbent President Richard Nixon of California and his running mate Vice President Spiro Agnew of Maryland. Nixon and Agnew defeated the Democratic nominees, Senator George McGovern of South Dakota and his running mate U.S. Ambassador Sargent Shriver of Maryland.

In a state substantially part of the conservative South, McGovern was viewed by many voters as a left-wing extremist because of his support for busing and civil rights, plus his opposition to the Vietnam War, support for granting amnesty to draft dodgers and support for a thousand-dollar giveaway to each American as a solution to poverty. Many, especially Republican campaigners, also believed McGovern would legalise abortion and illicit drugs if he were elected – despite the fact that his running mate Sargent Shriver was firmly opposed to abortion. These fears of McGovern's social radicalism were especially pronounced amongst poorer whites, who were abundant in the southern part of Missouri.

Nixon carried Missouri with 62.29% of the vote to McGovern's 37.71%, a victory margin of 24.58%. Nixon won all but two jurisdictions: Monroe County and St. Louis City, and was the first Republican to ever carry southern secessionist Mississippi County and Maries County, the first since Abraham Lincoln in 1864 to carry “Little Dixie” Howard and Randolph Counties, and the first since Ulysses S. Grant in 1868 to carry Lewis, Lincoln, Ralls and Ray Counties. , this is the last election in which Jackson County, which contains most of Kansas City, as well as Independence, the hometown of former Democratic president Harry S. Truman (who died seven weeks after the election), voted for a Republican presidential candidate.

Results

Results by county

See also
 United States presidential elections in Missouri

References

Missouri
1972
1972 Missouri elections